Joanne "Jo" Stepaniak (born 1954) is an American writer specializing in veganism and nutrition. She is the author of several books on the subject, including The Vegan Sourcebook (1998).

Stepaniak was elected to the Vegetarian Hall of Fame in June 2008 in Johnstown, Pennsylvania, at the 34th Annual Vegetarian Summerfest of the North American Vegetarian Society.

Selected works 

 Vegan Vittles: Recipes Inspired by the Critters of Farm Sanctuary, Book Publishing Company, 1996
 The Vegan Sourcebook, Lowell House, November 1998. Second edition: McGraw-Hill, October 1, 2000
 The Saucy Vegetarian: Quick & Healthful No-Cook Sauces & Dressings, Book Publishing Company, January 2000
 Being Vegan: Living with Conscience, Conviction, and Compassion, Lowell House, 2000
 Vegan Deli: Wholesome Ethnic Fast Food, Book Publishing Company, 2001
 Raising Vegetarian Children, McGraw-Hill, September 25, 2002
 The Ultimate Uncheese Cookbook: Delicious Dairy-Free Cheeses and Classic "Uncheese" Dishes, Book Publishing Company, 10 Anv edition, December 2003
 Food Allergy Survival Guide: Surviving and Thriving With Food Allergies and Sensitivities, Healthy Living Publications. August 2004

References

External links 

 Stepaniak answers questions about veganism 
 Discussion board Stepaniak moderates 
 Stepaniak explains the term "vegan" 
 Stepaniak interview at VegFamily.com

1954 births
American food writers
American veganism activists
Living people
Place of birth missing (living people)
Vegan cookbook writers
Women cookbook writers